Field Marshal Charles Lennox, 3rd Duke of Richmond, 3rd Duke of Lennox, 3rd Duke of Aubigny,  (22 February 1735 – 29 December 1806), styled Earl of March until 1750, of Goodwood House in Sussex and of Richmond House in London, was a British Army officer and politician. He associated with the Rockingham Whigs and rose to hold the post of Southern Secretary for a brief period. He was noteworthy for his support for the colonists during the American Revolutionary War, his support for a policy of concession in Ireland and his advanced views on the issue of parliamentary reform. He is believed by many to be the source of the second parchment copy of the US Declaration of Independence, known as the 'Sussex Declaration'. He went on to be a reforming Master-General of the Ordnance first in the Rockingham ministry and then in the ministry of William Pitt.

Origins
He was the son and heir of Charles Lennox, 2nd Duke of Richmond of Goodwood and of Richmond House, by his wife Sarah Cadogan, a daughter of William Cadogan, 1st Earl Cadogan.

Career
He was educated at Westminster School and Leiden University and succeeded his father as Duke of Richmond in August 1750. He was commissioned as an ensign in the 2nd Foot Guards in March 1752, promoted to captain in the 20th Regiment of Foot on 18 June 1753 and was admitted a Fellow of the Royal Society on 11 December 1755.

Richmond became Lieutenant-Colonel of the 33rd Regiment of Foot on 7 June 1756. A second battalion (2nd/33rd) of this regiment was raised and in 1757, and the following year it became an independent regiment, the 72nd Foot; Richmond was appointed its lieutenant colonel, while his younger brother George took command of the 33rd Regiment (1st/33rd). In May 1758 he became Colonel of the 72nd Regiment.

Richmond took part in the Raid on Cherbourg in August 1758 and served as aide-de-camp to Prince Frederick of Brunswick at the Battle of Minden in August 1759. Promoted to major general on 9 March 1761, he saw the 72nd Regiment disbanded in 1763 at the end of the Seven Years' War. He was appointed Lord Lieutenant of Sussex on 18 October 1763.

Richmond was appointed British ambassador extraordinary in Paris and made a Privy Counsellor in 1765, and in the following year he briefly served as Southern Secretary in the Rockingham Whig administration, resigning office on the accession of Pitt the Elder in July 1766. He was promoted to lieutenant general on 30 April 1770 and was briefly leader of the parliamentary Whigs in opposition in 1771 when Rockingham's wife was ill. Richmond's anti-colonial positions earned him the epithet "the radical duke." 

In the debates on the policy that led to the American Revolutionary War Richmond was a firm supporter of the colonists, and he initiated the debate in 1778 calling for the removal of British troops from America, during which Pitt (now the Earl of Chatham) was seized by his fatal illness. Nevertheless, as Lord Lieutenant he raised the Sussex Militia for home defence and took personal command as Colonel (a position he held until 1804, despite his advanced age).

Richmond also advocated a policy of concession in Ireland, with reference to which he originated the phrase "a union of hearts" which long afterwards became famous when his use of it had been forgotten. In 1779 Richmond brought forward a motion for retrenchment of the civil list, and in 1780 he embodied in a bill his proposals for parliamentary reform, which included manhood suffrage, annual parliaments and equal electoral areas. He was elected to the American Philosophical Society in 1787.

Richmond joined the Second Rockingham Ministry as Master-General of the Ordnance in March 1782; he was appointed a Knight of the Garter on 17 April 1782 and promoted to full general on 20 November 1782. He resigned as Master-General when the Fox–North coalition came to power in April 1783.

In January 1784 he joined the First Pitt the Younger Ministry as Master-General of the Ordnance; in this role he reformed the Department, introducing salaries for office holders, starting a survey of the South Coast (which led to the formation of the Ordnance Survey) and introducing new artillery (leading to the formation of the Royal Horse Artillery). 

He now developed strongly Tory opinions, and his alleged desertion of the cause of reform led to accusations of apostasy, and an attack on him by Lord Lauderdale in 1792, which nearly led to a duel. In November 1795, when Thomas Hardy and John Horne Tooke were charged with treason and cited his publications on reform in their defence, Richmond became a liability to the Government and was dismissed in February 1795. He became colonel of the Royal Horse Guards on 18 July 1795 and was promoted to field marshal on 30 July 1796. On 15 June 1797 he raised a Yeomanry artillery troop, the Duke of Richmond's Light Horse Artillery at his estate at Goodwood. The troop was equipped with his own design of Curricle gun carriage.

In retirement Richmond built the famous racecourse at the family seat of Goodwood. He was also a patron of artists such as George Stubbs, Pompeo Batoni, Anton Raphael Mengs, Joshua Reynolds and George Romney.

Marriage

On 1 April 1757, he married Lady Mary Bruce (d.1796), a daughter of Charles Bruce, 3rd Earl of Ailesbury and his third wife, Lady Caroline Campbell. The wedding was held at the house of Major-General Henry Conway in Warwick Street, St James, with the consent of the Major-General, one of Mary's guardians, by special licence of the Dean and Chapter of Canterbury Cathedral, given the then vacancy of the See of Canterbury, and performed by Frederick Keppel, then Canon of Windsor and the future Bishop of Exeter. The marriage failed to produce any legitimate issue.

Mistresses and illegitimate issue

Mrs Mary Bennett
As he acknowledged in his will he had three illegitimate daughters (Elizabeth, Caroline and Mary) by Mrs Mary Bennett (1765-1845), described as "his housekeeper", also known at sometime as Mrs. Mary Blesard, 30 years his junior. She was buried in Florence in the "English Cemetery" of the Cimitero di Pinti, where her gravestone survives (next to that of her daughter Caroline Napier) inscribed: SACRED/ TO THE MEMORY OF M. BENNET/ THE FOND MOTHER OF M. NAPIER/ BY WHOSE SIDE SHE NOW LIETH/ SHE DEPARTED THIS LIFE THE 13TH SEPTEMBER 1845/ IN THE EIGHTIETH YEAR OF HER AGE To these daughters he bequeathed the sum of £10,000 each, and to Mrs Bennett he bequeathed his estate in Earl's Court, Kensington.
Mary Bennett, who at the age of 19 married William Light (1786-1839), founder of the City of Adelaide in Australia. 
Caroline Bennett (9 August 1806 – 5 September 1836), who married her first cousin Henry Edward Napier, son of Colonel Hon. George Napier and Lady Sarah Lennox, sister of the 3rd Duke. He was the author of Florentine History from the earliest Authentic Records to the Accession of Ferdinand the Third, Grandduke of Tuscany, and a brother of General Sir Charles James Napier, conqueror of the Sindh. She died at the Villa Capponi in Florence and her inscribed gravestone survives in the "English Cemetery" of the Cimitero di Pinti, Florence, next to that of her mother.

Vicomtesse de Cambis
By his French mistress Gabrielle d'Alsace-Hénin-Liétard (d.1808), (Vicomtesse de Cambis), wife of the Comte de Cambis and sister of the Prince de Chimay, he had another illegitimate daughter:

Henrietta Anne le Clerc (1773-1846), variously called "a protégée of the Duchess" and "a long acknowledged daughter of His Grace". The 3rd Duke referred to her in his will as "Miss Henrietta Anne le Clerc, who resides with me and though Christened by the name of Anne only, is called Henrietta and whom I have [educated?] from her childhood", and bequeathed her an annual income of £2,000. In 1778, aged 5, Henriette had been brought from France by the Duke's sister Lady Louisa Conolly, to live at Goodwood House. It was in Henrietta's bedroom in Richmond House in London where in 1791 the fire started which destroyed that building. By the Duke's will she received the life tenure of West Lavant House and Park and other lands and farms on the Goodwood Estate. On 28 March 1808, at St. James's Church, Westminster, she married General John Dorrien (1758-1825), Royal Regiment of Horseguards, by whom she had a son, Charles Dorrien. After her husband's death she turned to the management of her estate, where she bred Merino sheep and hunted with Colonel Wyndham's foxhounds.

Death, burial and succession
Richmond died at Goodwood on 29 December 1806 and was buried in nearby Chichester Cathedral in Sussex. As he left no legitimate issue he was succeeded in the peerage by his nephew Charles Lennox, 4th Duke of Richmond.

The Sussex Declaration
On April 21, 2017, the Declaration Resources Project at Harvard University announced that a second parchment manuscript copy had been discovered at West Sussex Record Office in Chichester, England.  Named the "Sussex Declaration" by its finders, Danielle Allen and Emily Sneff, it differs from the National Archives copy (which the finders refer to as the "Matlack Declaration") in that the signatures on it are not grouped by States.  How it came to be in England is not yet known, but the finders believe that the randomness of the signatures points to an origin with signatory James Wilson, who had argued strongly that the Declaration was made not by the States but by the whole people. The Sussex Declaration was probably brought to Sussex, England by Charles Lennox, 3rd Duke of Richmond.

Memorials
Richmond County, Georgia, created in 1777 was named after him.

References

Sources

 L. Barlow & R.J. Smith, The Uniforms of the British Yeomanry Force 1794–1914, 1: The Sussex Yeomanry Cavalry, London: Robert Ogilby Trust/Tunbridge Wells: Midas Books, ca 1979, .
 Col George Jackson Hay, An Epitomized History of the Militia (The Constitutional Force), London:United Service Gazette, 1905. 
 J.R. Western, The English Militia in the Eighteenth Century: The Story of a Political Issue 1660–1802, London: Routledge & Kegan Paul, 1965.

External links

|-

1735 births
1806 deaths
33rd Regiment of Foot officers
British field marshals
Coldstream Guards officers
Deputy Lieutenants of the Tower Hamlets
Diplomatic peers
203
303
Dukes of Aubigny
Charles
Fellows of the Royal Society
Knights of the Garter
Lancashire Fusiliers officers
Lord-Lieutenants of Sussex
Sussex Militia officers
Members of the Privy Council of Great Britain
People educated at Westminster School, London
Royal Horse Guards officers
Secretaries of State for the Southern Department
Ambassadors of Great Britain to France
Sussex Yeomanry officers
Burials at Chichester Cathedral
Members of the American Philosophical Society
British Army personnel of the Seven Years' War